Hoàng Cao Khải (1850, Đức Thọ District – 1933) was a viceroy of Tonkin (locally known as Bắc Kỳ), the northernmost of the three parts of Vietnam under French colonial rule. He is best known for his role in helping the French authorities to hunt down Phan Đình Phùng, the leading Vietnamese revolutionary of the time.

References

External links 
Information on Vietnamese history 

 

1850 births
1933 deaths
People from Hà Tĩnh province
Vietnamese politicians
Vietnamese independence movement